Sam Has 7 Friends was a 2006 series drama created, produced, and funded by the production company Big Fantastic and subsequently bought and distributed by the studio Vuguru.  The series appeared on YouTube, Revver, iTunes and its own web site.  The show revolved around its tagline, "Samantha Breslow has seven friends.  On December 15, 2006, one of them will kill her," with each episode bringing Sam one day closer to her death.

History 
The series was created as an experiment by a group of young Los Angeles-based filmmakers – Douglas Cheney, Chris Hampel, Chris McCaleb, Ryan Wise, and producer Marqus Blakely – in their spare time.  The project was on a budget of $50,000.  Chris Hampel and Chris McCaleb were also working on Michael Mann's film Miami Vice, Hampel as Mann's assistant, McCaleb as an assistant editor.

The group formed a production company called Big Fantastic and set about creating a series of webisodes.  The producers believed there was an untapped market for people with short attention spans, or office workers with only sporadic free time, who would watch a short-form scripted, serialized drama. The series was distributed for free on YouTube, Revver, iTunes and its own site, samhas7friends.com.  The series was produced with no business model, and only minimal support from advertising via post-roll Revver ads. Since the demise of Revver, all episodes and related content was moved over to Blip.TV which provided revenue to the producers by pre-roll ads until its demise in 2015.

Story 

Sam Has 7 Friends is variously described as a soap opera or murder mystery.  The story follows an attractive cast of young actors around LA with the knowledge, throughout the series, that one of them is going to kill Samantha Breslow, an aspiring actress.

The seven "friends" that appear in the series opening credits are Sam's boyfriend Patrick, her ex-boyfriend Willie, her best friend Dani, Dani's boyfriend Chivo, her neighbor Scott, Patrick's other girlfriend Vera, and Sam's agent Roman.

The characters get in various fights with each other over the course of the 80 episodes.  With webisodes of only 90 seconds a piece, each episode focused on the most interesting minute and a half of the characters' days.

Throughout the series, Sam has a bad run of luck, going through two break-ups, struggling to find acting work and getting in fights with her best friend, her agent and her sister.  After attempting various reconciliations, she decides she has had her fill of LA

On the December 15, 2006 episode Sam is murdered while preparing to move out of her apartment and leave L.A. forever.  The murderer cannot be seen in this final episode, leaving the mystery up in the air.  According to the last episode posted on YouTube on June 29, 2009, the answer would be revealed in Prom Queen: The Homecoming.

Reception 
Critics had mixed reactions to Sam Has 7 Friends.  Virginia Heffernan of the New York Times described the series as "respectably viral."  Television critic Andrew Wallenstein was perplexed by the series, and suggested that "maybe drama remains the domain of traditional mediums."

The series received small audiences of several thousand viewers at YouTube, Revver and its own site.  At iTunes the show was more popular, receiving more than 10,000 downloads a day through the show's run.

After Sam's Death 

While the show attracted 3 million views during its initial run, Sam Has 7 Friends caught the eye of the United Talent Agency, one of the "Big 5" Hollywood talent agencies, which operates a unit to scout for online talent.

After shopping the series around, United Talent Agency and Big Fantastic caught the eye of Michael Eisner, the former CEO of Walt Disney who was creating a studio to produce content for the internet.  Eisner acquired the rights for Season 1 of Sam Has 7 Friends as well as an option to produce any future seasons.  Through his new production company, Vuguru, Eisner funded the production of Big Fantastic's second series, Prom Queen.  That series debuted on MySpace on April 1, 2007.

In October 2012, both "Sam Has 7 Friends" and "Prom Queen" were relaunched on The CW's website.

References

External links
 samhas7friends.com — Official site

2006 web series debuts
2006 web series endings
American drama web series
Video podcasts